American country artist Crystal Gayle has released 25 studio albums, 17 compilation albums, two video albums, one live album, one soundtrack album, and has appeared on 16 additional albums. Gayle signed with United Artists Records in 1974 and began recording albums. Her self-titled debut album was issued in 1975, peaking at number 25 on the Billboard Top Country Albums chart. After releasing two similar studio albums, Gayle issued We Must Believe in Magic in 1977. Reaching number two on the country albums chart and number 12 on the Billboard 200, it became the first album by a female country artist to be certified platinum by the Recording Industry Association of America. When I Dream (1978) also peaked in the second position of the Top Country Albums survey and was certified platinum in the US. Her seventh studio album, Miss the Mississippi (1979), was issued on Columbia Records and certified gold in the United States. These Days achieved similar status in 1980. Her ninth studio album entitled Hollywood, Tennessee (1981) contained several cover versions of pop music songs. In 1983, Gayle issued her first greatest hits compilation, Crystal Gayle's Greatest Hits before leaving Columbia. The album was certified gold from the RIAA a decade later.

Gayle recorded the soundtrack for One from the Heart with Tom Waits before signing with Elektra Records. Her tenth studio album, True Love (1982), peaked at number 14 on the Top Country Albums chart and number 120 on the Billboard 200. Cage the Songbird (1983) reached the fifth position on the country albums survey and became her final release to appear on the Billboard 200. Following the release of her twelfth studio album in 1985, Gayle collaborated with Gary Morris to record What If We Fall in Love? (1986). This was followed by a Christmas album and her final studio album of the decade in 1988, Nobody's Angel. Although her popularity declined, Gayle continued recording, releasing the studio albums Ain't Gonna Worry (1990) and Three Good Reasons. During the mid 1990s, Gayle began venturing into different styles of music. She issued an album of Gospel music entitled Someday in 1995 and an album of Children's music in 2000, In My Arms. She also recorded two albums of American standard songs during this time. Gayle's most recent was 2003's All My Tomorrows.

Studio albums

Compilation albums

Other major releases

Other albums

Video albums

Other appearances

Notes

References

External links 
 Crystal Gayle at Rate Your Music

Discographies of American artists
Country music discographies